Voznesensky is a rural locality (a settlement) and the administrative center of Voznesenskoye Rural Settlement, Talovsky District, Voronezh Oblast, Russia. The population was 587 as of 2010. There are 3 streets.

Geography 
Voznesensky is located 10 km southwest of Talovaya (the district's administrative centre) by road. Vysoky is the nearest rural locality.

References 

Rural localities in Talovsky District